The University Service Units is  the collective term used by the Ministry of Defence for the University Royal Naval Unit, the Officers' Training Corps and the University Air Squadron. They are considered reserves of the British Armed Forces, however they have "no call out liability".

See also
Volunteer Reserves
Regular Reserve
Sponsored Reserves
Reserve Officers' Training Corps, the United States equivalent

References

Military units and formations of the United Kingdom
University organisations of the British Armed Forces